Mirosław Złotkowski (born in Białystok, Poland, 23 June 1956 – died in Christchurch, New Zealand, 24 March 2006) was a Polish Greco-Roman wrestler who changed to Freestyle wrestling after emigrating to New Zealand.

He was among the most promising young wrestlers in Poland, where he represented the MZKS Jelenia Gora club, in mid to late 1970s, frequently finishing in the top three at national tournaments. He was also member of the training squad for the 1980 Olympics but due to personal circumstances decided to temporarily retire from the sport.

After a lengthily pause he resumed wrestling in New Zealand. In 1991 he joined the Bryndwr YMCA and Crichton Cobbers clubs in Christchurch, where he was trained by Steve Yarbrough. He won gold at the New Zealand national wrestling championship in July 1991 and a bronze medal at the IV Commonwealth Wrestling Championship, in Dunedin, in October 1991, both in the 100 – 130 kg category. He also won the National Tauranga Highland Games in the Open Division in March 1992.

He died on 24 March 2006 of bile duct cancer, and was buried at Sydenham Cemetery.

Notable achievements

References 
 The Press, Monday, 22 July 1991
 News Advertiser, Monday, 5 August 1991
 Christchurch Star, Tuesday, 30 July 1991

External links 
 International Wrestling Database

1956 births
2006 deaths
New Zealand male sport wrestlers
Polish emigrants to New Zealand
Polish male sport wrestlers
Sportspeople from Białystok
Deaths from cholangiocarcinoma
Deaths from cancer in New Zealand
Burials at Sydenham Cemetery
20th-century Polish people
21st-century Polish people